Apomyelois bistriatella is a species of snout moth in the genus Apomyelois. It was described by George Duryea Hulst in 1887. It is known from California, the eastern United States, northern Europe and Russia.

The wingspan is 15–25 mm. Adults are on wing from June to July.

The larvae feed on a fungus, Daldinia vernicosa, which grows on burnt gorse and dead birch. It has also been recorded feeding on Hypoxylon occidentale in California.

Subspecies
Apomyelois bistriatella bistriatella
Apomyelois bistriatella subcognata (Ragonot, 1887)

References

Phycitini
Moths described in 1887
Moths of Europe
Moths of North America